Blue Matter is the third album by the band Savoy Brown. Teaming up once again with producer Mike Vernon, it finds them experimenting even more within the blues framework. Several tracks feature piano (played by Bob Hall, guitarist Kim Simmonds, and vocalist Chris Youlden, who plays guitar here) as well as trombone.

This album featured a mix of live and studio recordings. The live tracks were recorded on December 6, 1968, at the now defunct City of Leicester College of Education, because the band was scheduled to tour the US and needed additional tracks to complete the album in time for the tour. The booking at the college represented their only chance to record the extra tracks in a live venue, before embarking on the tour. An offer to perform the concert free of charge was accepted by Chris Green, the college Social Secretary, who had made the original booking, and the concert was duly recorded, a number of the live tracks being added to the album.

Because Chris Youlden was suffering from tonsillitis, Dave Peverett stood in as lead vocalist on the live tracks.

The album track "Vicksburg Blues" had first appeared as the B-side of Decca single F 12797 (released June 1968), fronted by "Walking by Myself".

Both Zigzag magazine and Rolling Stone magazine considered "Train to Nowhere" as the quintessential Savoy Brown song.

Track listing
 "Train to Nowhere" (Kim Simmonds, Chris Youlden) – 4:12
 "Tolling Bells" (Simmonds, Youlden) – 6:33
 "She's Got a Ring in His Nose and a Ring on Her Hand" (Youlden) – 3:07
 "Vicksburg Blues" (Bob Hall, Youlden) – 4:00
 "Don't Turn Me from Your Door" (John Lee Hooker) – 5:04
 "Grits Ain't Groceries (All Around the World)" (Titus Turner) – 2:42 (CD bonus track)
 "May Be Wrong" (live) (Dave Peverett) – 7:50
 "Louisiana Blues" (live) (McKinley Morganfield) – 9:06
 "It Hurts Me Too" (live) (Mel London) – 6:53

Personnel

Savoy Brown
Chris Youlden – lead vocals, guitar, piano
Kim Simmonds – lead guitar, harmonica, piano
"Lonesome" Dave Peverett – rhythm guitar, plus lead vocal on live tracks 7, 8, 9
Tone Stevens – bass (except on tracks 1, 2 and 4)
Rivers Jobe – bass (on tracks 1, 2 and 4)
Roger Earl – drums, percussion
Bob Hall – piano

Additional musicians
Terry Flannery, Keith Martin, Brian Perrin, Derek Wadsworth – tenor trombones on "Train to Nowhere"
Alan Moore - Bb/f trombone on "Train to Nowhere"
Mike Vernon – percussion on "Train to Nowhere"

Production
Track one arranged by Terry Noonan, Savoy Brown & Mike Vernon
Produced by Mike Vernon
Recorded & Engineered by Roy Thomas Baker
Assistant Recording Engineers: Colin Freeman, Michael Mailes, John Punter, Mike Vernon
David Anstey - cover design
David Wedgbury - photography

References

External links
Savoy Brown's Homepage

1969 albums
Savoy Brown albums
Decca Records albums
Albums produced by Mike Vernon (record producer)